Silver Corners is an unincorporated community in Graham Township, Benton County, Minnesota, United States.  The community is located near the junction of Benton County Road 2 and State Highway 25 (MN 25).  Nearby places include Rice and Gilman.  Mayhew Creek flows through the community.

References

Unincorporated communities in Benton County, Minnesota
Unincorporated communities in Minnesota